Santa Cruz II is a cruise ship operating around the Galapagos Islands for Metropolitan Touring. The ship can accommodate 90 guests housed in 50 cabins over three decks.

References

External links
 Official website

2002 ships
Ships of Ecuador